The Great Lakes tectonic zone (GLTZ) is bounded by South Dakota at its tip and heads northeast to south of Duluth, Minnesota, then heads east through northern Wisconsin, Marquette, Michigan, and then trends more northeasterly to skim the northernmost shores of lakes.

Algoman orogeny added landmass to the Superior province by volcanic activity and continental collision along a boundary that stretches from present-day South Dakota, U.S., into the Lake Huron region near Sudbury, Ontario, Canada.

The zone is characterized by active compression during the Algoman orogeny (about ), a pulling-apart (extensional) tectonics (2,450 to 2,100 million years ago), a second compression during the Penokean orogeny (1,900 to 1,850 million years ago), a second extension during Middle Proterozoic time (1,600 million years ago) and minor reactivation during Phanerozoic time (the past 500 million years).

Collision began along the Great Lakes tectonic zone with the Algoman mountain-building event and continued for tens of millions of years. During the formation of the GLTZ, the gneissic Minnesota River Valley subprovince was thrust up onto the Superior province's edge as it consumed the Superior province's oceanic crust. The Wyoming province is the continental landmass that is hypothesized to have rifted away from the southern Superior province portion of Kenorland, before moving rapidly west and docking with the Laurentia supercontinent 1,850 to 1,715 million years ago. Sedimentation from the GLTZ-rifting environment continued into the Penokean orogeny, which is the next major tectonic event in the Great Lakes region. Several earthquakes have been documented in Minnesota, Michigan's Upper Peninsula and Sudbury in the last 120 years along the GLTZ.

Location

During the Late Archean Eon the Algoman orogeny – which occurred about  – added landmass through volcanic activity and continental collision along a boundary that stretches from present-day South Dakota, U.S., into the Sudbury, Ontario, Canada, region. This crustal boundary is the Great Lakes tectonic zone (GLTZ).

Mechanism

Collision

The collision of the gneissic Minnesota River Valley (MRV) subprovince onto the southern edge of the Superior province was another process in the slow change in tectonics which marks the end of the Archean Eon. This gneissic terrane originally extended several hundred kilometers east to west, making it more of a protocontinent than a future Superior province belt. The boundary that separates the two colliding bodies is the Great Lakes tectonic zone; it is a fault zone of highly deformed rocks. The collision is interpreted to have happened obliquely at an angle, beginning in the west.

Suturing

The MRV subprovince experienced two distinct high-grade metamorphic events, one  and the other . The first was probably during formation of the terrane, the second was during suturing. The growth of the Superior province greenstone-granitic terranes ended with the suturing of the Minnesota River Valley gneiss terrane to the basaltic Wawa subprovince. Suturing, the last stage of closure, started in South Dakota and continued eastward.

During the formation of the GLTZ, the MRV protocontinent consumed the Superior province's oceanic crust as the subprovince came in from the south. Suturing of one continental block onto another usually occurs because a subduction zone exists beneath one of the blocks. The subduction zone consumes the oceanic crust connected to the other block. After the oceanic crust is consumed, the two blocks meet and the subducting oceanic crust pulls the attached continental block under the other. During the collision with the Superior province, the MRV gneissic block was thrust up onto the Superior province's edge; this resulted in a thrusted crumpled fault tens of kilometers wide producing a mountain range, and a shear zone which defines the boundary between the two terranes. Tectonism along the zone began during the docking of the two terranes into a single continental mass, and culminated in the early Proterozoic, where deformation took place under low to intermediate pressures.

Rifting

After suturing, the region was tectonically quiet for a few hundred million years. The Algoman Mountains had been built and then eroded into sediments that covered the area. This is when the Wyoming province is hypothesized to have drifted away from the Superior province.

Cessation of rifting

The pattern of sedimentation from this rifting environment continued into the Penokean orogeny, which is the next major tectonic event in the Great Lakes region. During the Penokean orogeny (1,850 to 1,900 million years ago), compression deformed the sequences in the Lake Superior region.

GLTZ in Marquette, Michigan, area

Recent geologic mapping in the Marquette, Michigan, U.S., area provides information of the structure for the zone along a  strike. The GLTZ was an active dextral strike-slip zone south of Marquette, passing under the large Marquette anticline. P.K. Sims and W.C. Day suggest that the kinematics determined in the exposed GLTZ – which are consistent – are applicable to its entire length.

Shear zone boundaries are subparallel and strike N60°W; the foliation in mylonite within the GLTZ strikes N70°W and dips S75°W. A stretching lineation (line of tectonic transport) in the mylonite foliation plunges 42° in a S43°E direction. In the Sims-and-Day model, this last collision in the assembly of the Superior province resulted from northwest-directed tectonic transport of the Minnesota River Valley subprovince terrane against the terrane of the Superior province. The collision was oblique, resulting in dextral-thrust shear along the boundary.

Composition of rock

Early Archean rocks generally form elongate, domal or circular bodies that are several kilometers thick. Late-stage dikes and sills of diabase, quartz-feldspar fine-grained instrusive rocks (aplite) and quartz-feldspar-mica coarse-grained intrusive rocks (pegmatite) are common.

Most of the region's crystalline rock bodies of Late Archean age are part of the greenstone-granite terrane of northern Minnesota, northwestern Wisconsin and the western part of the Upper Peninsula of Michigan. Lithologies of the rocks are usually gneissose and migmatitic. Repeated metamorphism and deformation caused extensive recrystallization, intense foliation, shear zones and folding. There are east-northeast- to east-trending faults in the gneissic rocks south of the Great Lakes tectonic zone in Minnesota, south of the Midcontinent Rift System in Wisconsin and in the Upper Peninsula of Michigan.

Minnesota

Crystalline rocks are more prominent in Minnesota, where they underlie , than they are in either Wisconsin or Michigan's Upper Peninsula.

Montevideo and Morton gneiss complexes

Recent radiometric age data indicates that there are four crystalline rock complexes 3,400 million years old in the Lake Superior region. The best-known units are the Morton Gneiss and the Montevideo Gneiss complexes, along the Minnesota River Valley in southwest Minnesota. Rocks exposed in the Minnesota River Valley include a complex of migmatitic granitic gneisses, schistose to gneissic amphibolite, metagabbro and paragneisses. The complex of ancient gneisses is intruded by a younger, weakly deformed granite body, the Sacred Heart granite.

Sacred Heart granitic bodies

The Sacred Heart granitic bodies that occur along portions of the Minnesota River Valley are relatively unfractured and unfoliated, and may represent passive intrusions into folded metasedimentary rocks. Similar intrusions farther east along the GLTZ show later dates, reinforcing the theorized closure from west to east.

Northern Wisconsin

Late Archean lithologies in northwestern Wisconsin and the Upper Peninsula of Michigan are similar to the Sacred Heart granite and consist of gneisses and migmatites.

The 1,850-million-year-old Penokean magmatism in Wisconsin represents margin-type igneous activity terminated by collision. Some of the Penokean granites show iron enrichment similar to the magnetite series, rather than the low-oxygen concentration of the magnetic titanium oxides. Penokean-age rocks in the northern Wisconsin and the Upper Peninsula of Michigan contain areas of low-pressure, low- to high-temperature metamorphism. The folding and metamorphism increased in intensity to the south and southeast, and produced the isolated gneissic 1,755-million-year-old Watersmeet Domes which straddle the border of Michigan and northeastern Wisconsin.

Michigan's Upper Peninsula

Compressive deformation during the Penokean orogeny reactivated the GLTZ, which followed deposition of the Marquette Range Supergroup sediments and resulted in a north-side up motion along steep brittle-ductile faults in the eastern, low-grade portion of the Marquette Trough In the western portion of the Marquette syncline, a second episode of GLTZ reactivation took place during the uplift of the post-Huronian 2,400- to 2,100-million-year-old granitic Southern Complex.

The Northern and Southern complexes of the Upper Peninsula are highly migmatized and intensely foliated, with the intensity of foliation increasing toward margins. The western part of the Southern Complex shows intricate phases of folding and foliation. These Late Archean rocks form a roughly north–south belt lying south of Marquette extending to the Michigan-Wisconsin border.

Sudbury, Ontario

The Sudbury Basin structure is located in Greater Sudbury at the erosional boundary between the Archean Superior province and the overlying sequence of early Proterozoic continental margin deposits. The structure consists of the Sudbury Igneous Complex, a differentiated sequence of intrusive volcanic rocks – norite, gabbro and
granophyre – overlain by breccias and metasedimenary rocks. The sublayer consists of a mass of basic to ultrabasic inclusions of varying size and frequency of occurrence. Sudbury gabbro varies between a gabbro and a norite, depending upon the local silicates' ratios. The quartz biotite gabbro is medium- to coarse-grained, the Climax quartz monzonite is medium-grained.

In the eastern Sudbury area the rock is highly crystalline hornblendic gneiss, which apparently dips at a rather low angle toward the southeast.

A paleostress analysis of the eastern exposures near Sudbury shows continuing dextral offset during the Penokean orogeny.

Wyoming province separation hypothesis

General information

An episode of hotspot gabbro magmatism occurred  at the eastern edge of the Wyoming craton, south of current-day Sudbury. Continental rifting is exhibited by emplacement of mafic igneous rocks on each side of the rift margins. By  the Superior and Wyoming provinces had completely separated. From about 2,100 to 1,865 million years ago the Wyoming craton drifted in a westward direction until it docked  with the Superior province, northwest of its original position.

Before rifting

During rifting

The Wyoming province was rotating away, with the Blue Draw Metagabbro being the pivot point. Harlan's reconstruction of this pivot is shown to the right.

After complete separation

Supporting evidence

Before rifting

Swarms of mafic dikes and sills are typical of continental rifting and can be used to time supercontinent breakup. Intrusion of the 2,475- to 2,445-million-year-old Matachewan-Hearst Mafic Dike Swarm and the 2,490- to 2,475-million-year-old East Bull Lake suite of layered mafic intrusive rocks are interpreted as indicating early Paleoproterozoic, mantle-hotspot driven rifting centered near Sudbury, Ontario, during the onset of Kenorland breakup.

The East Bull Lake intrusive suite, in the southern Superior province near Sudbury, Ontario, aligns spatially with the Blue Draw Metagabbro if the Superior and Wyoming cratons are restored to the Kenorland configuration proposed by Roscoe and Card (1993). These layered mafic intrusions are of similar thickness and identical age, and occur along a rifted belt.
 
These Huronian and Snowy Pass sedimentary rocks are similar, each having 2,450- to 2,100-million-year-old epicratonic rifts succeeded by a 2,100- to 1,800-million-year-old passive sedimentary margins.

During rifting

Much of the southeastern Superior province was bisected by the more than  2,172- to 2,167-million-year-old Biscotasing Diabase Swarm which trended northeast from Sudbury. In southcentral Wyoming province there is a 2,170 ± 8-million-year-old quartz diorite dike of Wind River Range.

After complete separation

By , the Wyoming craton is thought to have completely separated from the southern Superior province, this is consistent with the occurrence of a 2,076- to 2,067-million-year-old hotspot centered just south of the Superior province and east of the MRV. The 2,125- to 2,101-million-year-old Marathon and 2,077- to 2,076-million-year-old Fort Frances dikes, both on the present-day Superior province north of the Great Lakes tectonic zone, are consistent with rifting during this time period.

Earthquakes

Minnesota has been the most seismically active in the region of Minnesota, Wisconsin, Michigan's Upper Peninsula and southern Ontario. Several earthquakes have been documented in Minnesota in the last 120 years, with at least six in the GLTZ. The epicenters show a clear relationship to tectonic features of the state; four epicenters lie along the Great Lakes tectonic zone. The best-documented event occurred on July 9, 1975, near Morris, Minnesota, with a magnitude of 4.6, and a felt area of  covering parts of four states.

Wisconsin has had no earthquakes along the GLTZ, Michigan's Upper Peninsula has had four earthquakes in the vicinity of the GLTZ – Negaunee, Newberry and two in Sault Ste. Marie – and the Sudbury area has had three earthquakes.

Notes

References

Geologic provinces
Geological history of the Great Lakes
Proterozoic North America
Hotspots of North America
Orogeny
Precambrian Canada
Precambrian United States
Plate tectonics
Supercontinents
Terranes